The Thai League Cup is a knock-out football tournament played in Thai sport. Some games are played as a single match, others are played as two-legged contests. The 2011 Thai League Cup kicked off on 18 May 2011 with the Bangkok & field regional qualifiers.

Calendar

Qualifying rounds 

This is the first edition of the competition and the qualifying round will be played in regions featuring clubs from the Regional League Division 2, had to compete in the qualifying rounds. it was divided into five groups by geographic region.

First round

|colspan="3" style="background-color:#99CCCC"|18 June 2011

|-
|colspan="3" style="background-color:#99CCCC"|19 June 2011

|-
|colspan="3" style="background-color:#99CCCC"|26 June 2011

|-
|colspan="3" style="background-color:#99CCCC"|2 July 2011

|}
 2 Tak , Mahasarakham United and Thanyaburi RA United have lucky of lotting to automatic qualify to first round.
 3 (C) is Champion in last season.
 4 (RC) is Runner-up in last season.
 5 Gulf Saraburi which automatic qualifying to first round withdrew before lotting.Globlex had lotted to replace its.

Bracket

Second round

|colspan="3" style="background-color:#99CCCC"|28 June 2011

|-
|colspan="3" style="background-color:#99CCCC"|29 June 2011

|-
|colspan="3" style="background-color:#99CCCC"|1 July 2011

|-
|colspan="3" style="background-color:#99CCCC"|6 July 2011

Third round

|-
|colspan="5" style="background-color:#99CCCC"| 1st leg on 5 July 2011.............2nd leg on 3 August 2011
|-

|-
|colspan="5" style="background-color:#99CCCC"| 1st leg on 6 July 2011.............2nd leg on 2 August 2011

|-
|colspan="5" style="background-color:#99CCCC"| 1st leg on 6 July 2011.............2nd leg on 13 July 2011

|-
|colspan="5" style="background-color:#99CCCC"| 1st leg on 6 July 2011.............2nd leg on 3 August 2011

|-
|colspan="5" style="background-color:#99CCCC"| 1st leg on 3 August 2011.............2nd leg on 10 August 2011

Quarter-finals

|-
|colspan="5" style="background-color:#99CCCC"| 1st leg on 17 August 2011.............2nd leg on 24 August 2011
|-

|-
|colspan="5" style="background-color:#99CCCC"| 1st leg on 17 August 2011.............2nd leg on 18 September 2011

|-
|colspan="5" style="background-color:#99CCCC"| 1st leg on 18 August 2011.............2nd leg on 14 September 2011

Semi-finals

|-
|colspan="5" style="background-color:#99CCCC"| 1st leg on 14 September 2011.............2nd leg on 21 September 2011
|-

|-
|colspan="5" style="background-color:#99CCCC"| 1st leg on 21 September 2011.............2nd leg on 21 September 2011

Finals

|colspan="3" style="background-color:#99CCCC"|4 February 2012

2011 in Thai football cups
Thailand League Cup
2011
2011